The 2013 USA Sevens was the tenth edition of the USA Sevens tournament, and the fifth tournament of the 2012–13 IRB Sevens World Series. The host stadium was the Sam Boyd Stadium in the Las Vegas-area community of Whitney, Nevada.

South Africa won the title by defeating New Zealand 40–21 in the final.

Format
The teams were divided into pools of four teams, who played a round-robin within the pool. Points were awarded in each pool on a different schedule from most rugby tournaments—3 for a win, 2 for a draw, 1 for a loss.
The top two teams in each pool advanced to the Cup competition. The four quarterfinal losers dropped into the bracket for the Plate. The Bowl was contested by the third- and fourth-place finishers in each pool, with the losers in the Bowl quarterfinals dropping into the bracket for the Shield.

Teams
The participating teams were:

Pool stage
The draw was made on February 2.

Pool A

Pool B

Pool C

Pool D

Knockout stage

Shield

Bowl

Plate

Cup

References

External links

USA Sevens Home Page

2013
USA Sevens
USA Sevens
USA Sevens 2013
USA Sevens